The Reelout Queer Film Festival is an annual LGBTQ film festival in Kingston, Ontario.

The festival was established in 1999 by Marney McDiarmid, a Queen's University graduate, with resource assistance from both the university and Ontario Public Interest Research Group. In the first year, films were screened at the city's gay bar, Club 477. In its second year, the festival moved to the Screening Room theatre, which has remained its primary venue ever since; the volunteers at the 2000 festival included Matt Salton, now the festival's director.

In 2010, the festival was briefly the subject of controversy when its application to present a program of short films directed by women at the Kingston Women's Art Festival was denied.

See also
 List of LGBT film festivals
 List of film festivals in Canada

References

External links

LGBT film festivals in Canada
Festivals in Kingston, Ontario
Film festivals in Ontario
Film festivals established in 1999
1999 establishments in Ontario
LGBT in Ontario